Vavin is a station of the Paris Métro on line 4 on the border of the 6th arrondissement and 14th arrondissement.

Location
The station, whose platforms are curved, is located under Place Pablo-Picasso, at the intersection of Boulevard du Montparnasse and Boulevard Raspail.

History
The station was opened on 9 January 1910 as part of the connecting section of the line under the Seine between Châtelet and Raspail. It is named after the Rue Vavin, named after 19th-century statesman Alexis Vavin.

A non-passenger track connection to line 12 lies between the station and Montparnasse - Bienvenüe. In 2018, 2,182,742 travelers entered this station placing it at 244th position of metro stations.

Passenger services

Access
The station has four entrances in front of Nos. 101, 103, 106 and 108 Boulevard du Montparnasse.

Station layout

Bus connections
intermodal
The station is served by Lines 58, 68, 82 and 91 of the RATP Bus Network and, at night, by Lines N01 and N02 of the Noctilien network.

Gallery

References

Roland, Gérard (2003). Stations de métro. D’Abbesses à Wagram. Éditions Bonneton.

Paris Métro stations in the 6th arrondissement of Paris
Paris Métro stations in the 14th arrondissement of Paris
Railway stations in France opened in 1910
Articles containing video clips